Si'ulagi Jack "Lonnie" Palelei (born October 15, 1970) is a former American football offensive guard and offensive tackle. He played college football at Purdue and UNLV. Selected by the Pittsburgh Steelers in the fifth round of the 1993 NFL Draft, Palelei played in the National Football League (NFL) for the Steelers, New York Jets, New York Giants, and Philadelphia Eagles. In 2001, he played for the Las Vegas Outlaws of the XFL.

References

1970 births
Living people
American sportspeople of Samoan descent
American football offensive guards
American football offensive tackles
UNLV Rebels football players
Pittsburgh Steelers players
New York Jets players
New York Giants players
People from Blue Springs, Missouri
Philadelphia Eagles players
Players of American football from Missouri
Players of American football from American Samoa
Purdue Boilermakers football players
People from Nu'uuli